Nascia is a genus of moths of the family Crambidae.

Species
Nascia acutellus (Walker, 1866)
Nascia cilialis (Hübner, 1796)
Nascia citrinalis Warren, 1892

References

Natural History Museum Lepidoptera genus database

Pyraustinae
Crambidae genera